Longjiang is a county under the jurisdiction of Qiqihar City in the west of Heilongjiang province of the People's Republic of China, bordering Inner Mongolia to the west and southwest. It is the home of astronaut Zhai Zhigang.

Administrative divisions 
Longjiang County is divided into 8 towns and 6 townships. 
8 towns
 Longjiang, Jingxing, Longxing, Shanquan, Qikeshu, Xingshan, Baishan, Touzhan
6 townships
 Heigang, Guanghou, Huamin, Harahai, Luhe, Jiqinhe

Climate

References 

Districts of Qiqihar